P. ehrenbergi may refer to:

 Pachysentis ehrenbergi, a parasitic worm
 Pogonioefferia ehrenbergi, a robber fly
 Polycarpa ehrenbergi, a marine invertebrate
 Pusillina ehrenbergi, a sea snail

See also

 P. ehrenbergii (disambiguation)